Georges Mamelonet (30 November 1954 – 11 March 2015) was a Canadian politician, who was elected to the National Assembly of Quebec for the riding of Gaspé in the 2008 provincial election. He was a member of the Quebec Liberal Party.

Prior to his election to the Assembly, Mamelonet served as mayor of Percé. He studied at École de la Marine nationale in Marseille, France, as a steam and diesel mechanic before moving in the Gaspésie region in 1978 and worked as a businessman and restaurateur until starting his political career. Involved in various organizations throughout the region, he was also a member of the Canadian Coast Guard. He died in a car accident on 11 March 2015.

References

External links
 

1954 births
2015 deaths
Mayors of places in Quebec
People from Casablanca
Quebec Liberal Party MNAs
Moroccan people of French descent
Moroccan emigrants to Canada
Road incident deaths in Canada
Accidental deaths in Quebec
21st-century Canadian politicians